Pauline Newstone is a Canadian voice actress best known as the voice of Airazor in the computer animated series Beast Wars and as Frieza in the English Ocean and Westwood dubs of Dragon Ball Z.

Voice credits
A Kind of Magic – Ferocia
Adventures of Mowgli – White Cobra
Beast Wars – Airazor (1996–1998)
Being Ian – Elderly Gang Leader, Nurse Sturgeon
Bitsy Bears – Shirley, Bramble
Bratz: Desert Jewelz – Old Woman
Bratz Kids: Fairy Tales – Witch
Captain N: The Game Master – Additional Voices
Captain Zed and the Zee Zone – Doris
Cats & Dogs 3: Paws Unite! – Sis
Class of the Titans – Campe, Medusa, Horror, Dread, Alarm
Dragon Ball Z – Frieza (1997–1998) (Ocean dub)
Dragon Tales – Sage
Fat Dog Mendoza – Ester
Funky Fables – The Queen, The Witch
Gintama° – Shop Lady
Hamtaro - Kaitlin Endo
Help! I'm a Fish – Aunt Anna
InuYasha – Mistress Centipede
Kong: The Animated Series – Harpy
Lego Ninjago: Masters of Spinjitzu – Aspheera
Maison Ikkoku – Yukari Godai
Master Keaton – Ms. Belnine
Monster Rancher – Mum Mew
Mummies Alive! – Heka
Ranma ½ – Sentaro's Grandmother
Sitting Ducks – Additional Voices
The Cramp Twins – Lily Parsons
Ultimate Book of Spells
X-Men: Evolution – Agatha Harkness
Yvon of the Yukon – Yvonne Ducharme, Lillian Valentine (in "Valentines Day")

References

External links

Year of birth missing (living people)
Living people
Place of birth missing (living people)
Canadian voice actresses
20th-century Canadian actresses
21st-century Canadian actresses